Chain of Desire is an American 1992 drama romance film directed by Temístocles López. It is a modern American remake of the film La Ronde. The film was presented at the Turin Film Festival in November 1992 and was released in the United States on June 25, 1993.

Plot
A series of unrelated amorous lovers are connected by a chain of desire. It begins when a woman named Alma flees from a would-be lover. She runs into a church, where she meets a man named Jesus and they eventually make love.

Jesus goes home to wife Isa and they make love. Isa leaves for an appointment with Dr. Buckley, with whom she is having an affair. Buckley then visits Linda, a dominatrix. Linda goes home to husband Hubert, a television commentator. Hubert has sex without her knowledge with a male teen, Keith.

Keith is introduced to exotic dancer Diana, who then has a fling with a much older artist, Mel. He goes home to an angry wife, Cleo. And that night, all of these people end up at a nightclub where Alma is performing. Alma has just learned that the lover she fled has been diagnosed with AIDS.

Cast
Ricky Middleton as Man At Club

Soundtrack
The film score was composed by Nathan Birnbaum with additional music by Peter Gordon.

The Chet Baker song "So Hard To Know", written by Roxanne Seeman and Rique Pantoja, appears in the film.

Reception
On review aggregate website Rotten Tomatoes, Chain of Desire has an approval rating of 60% based on 5 reviews.

Richard Harrington of The Washington Post remarked the film "is an odd mix: an American update of Max Ophüls's The Circle, a sexual Slackers and an MTV-style public service announcement on AIDS stretched out to 105 minutes of tragicomedy with a heavy-handed message that works emotionally, but not at all logically." Harrington critiqued the film’s lack of character development and concluded "in trying to create a democracy of victims who casually cross sexual, ethnic and economic lines, Lopez ends up creating unamusing comedy and unmoving tragedy. As an erotic morality play, it's about as convincing as Madonna's last record."

Nominations
 Nancy Schreiber: 1993 Independent Spirit Award - Best Cinematography (Nominated)

References

External links

1992 films
1992 independent films
1992 romantic drama films
HIV/AIDS in American films
American romantic drama films
Films about adultery in the United States
Films set in New York City
1992 drama films
1990s English-language films
1990s American films